Nob Hill is a neighborhood in San Francisco, California, United States.

Nob Hill may also refer to:

Nob Hill, Albuquerque, a neighborhood in Albuquerque, New Mexico, U.S.
Nob Hill, Portland, Oregon, a neighborhood in Portland, Oregon, U.S.
Nob Hill (Hong Kong), a private housing estate in Hong Kong
Nob Hill (film), a 1945 musical drama
Nob Hill Foods, a trading name for the Raley's Supermarkets chain in the western United States
Nob Hill at Guantanamo Bay Naval Station, Cuba

See also
Knob Hill (disambiguation)